Frank Harry Shugart (December 10, 1866 – September 9, 1944) was an American professional baseball shortstop. He played in Major League Baseball (MLB) for the Chicago Pirates, Pittsburgh Pirates, St. Louis Browns, Louisville Colonels, Philadelphia Phillies. and Chicago White Sox.

Shugart was blacklisted from baseball after the 1901 season because of an altercation on August 21, 1901, in which he punched an umpire in the face and teammate Jack Katoll beaned the umpire in the leg. Katoll only received an 11-game suspension, while Shugart never played in the Major Leagues again.

References

External links

1866 births
1944 deaths
Major League Baseball shortstops
Baseball players from Pennsylvania
19th-century baseball players
Chicago Pirates players
Pittsburgh Pirates players
Philadelphia Phillies players
St. Louis Browns (NL) players
Chicago White Sox players
Louisville Colonels players
Elmira Hottentots players
Burlington Hawkeyes players
Minneapolis Millers (baseball) players
St. Paul Apostles players
St. Paul Saints (Western League) players
Chicago White Stockings (minor league) players
People from Clearfield County, Pennsylvania
Galesburg Boosters players